Henrique da Silva may refer to:

 Henrique da Silva (fighter) (born 1989), Brazilian mixed martial artist
 Henrique da Silva (footballer) (born 1972), Brazilian football defender
 Henrique Da Silva Gomes (born 1982), Brazilian footballer
 Henrique da Silva Coutinho, governor of the Brazilian state of Espírito Santo
 Henrique da Silva Horta (1920–2012), Portuguese colonial administrator and Portuguese Navy admiral